Raoul Mal (born 19 February 2000) is a Romanian professional footballer who plays as a midfielder for Eccellenza Piedmont-Aosta Valley club RG Ticino.

Club career
He made his Serie C debut for Pro Vercelli on 7 September 2018 in a game against Arezzo.

On 31 January 2022 Pistoiese announced the transfer of Mal to CFR Cluj.

Career statistics

Club

References

External links
 

2000 births
Living people
Italian people of Romanian descent
Romanian footballers
Association football midfielders
Serie C players
U.S. Pistoiese 1921 players
F.C. Pro Vercelli 1892 players
CFR Cluj players